Trostyanets-Smorodyne (Ukrainian: Тростянець-Смородине), until 1893 Trostyanets and preceding 2018 Smorodyne is a railway station in Trostyanets, Ukraine. It is a major passenger station on the Southern Railways Boromlya-Kyrykivka line. It is located in the center of Trostyanets.

History

The Smorodyne section of the Kharkiv-Mykolaiv railway was created from 1871 to 1877. To organize train and shunting work in 1877, a locomotive depot was built and 12 locomotives were purchased. The station was founded in 1878 and was originally called Trostyanets. On January 21 (February 2), 1893, the Minister of Railways ordered Trostyanets station of the Kharkiv-Mykolayiv Railway to be renamed Smorodyne station after the name of the nearby village. Today the village of Smorodyne is part of the city of Trostyanets. The first station house was built in 1878 and was originally wooden.

In 1982, a new station complex was built thanks to the allocated funds of the Southern Railways management. During the construction, the city's industrial enterprises provided great assistance. The station was built according to an individual project, which had no analogues on the railways of the USSR. This project was awarded the USSR State Prize. Residents of Trostyanets call the railway station "the hospitable gate". From the city side, the station resembles a hut. Nearby are the EC post and a magnificent railway monument with an Em708-89 locomotive, which was built in 1935 at the Izhora plant "Red Profintern".

At Trostyanets-Smorodyne station there is a locomotive depot (TC-8), a locomotive maintenance point (PTOL), an operation and repair shop, a locomotive crew rest house, a household building and a museum of the history of the Trostyanets-Smorodyne locomotive depot.

On 40th Army Square, near the station, a T-34-85 tank was installed in honor of the 183rd Tank Brigade, which distinguished itself in the battles during the liberation of the city of Trostyanets from Nazi invaders.

On October 31, 1962, the Smorodyne branch of Southern Railways was reorganized into the Sumy branch with the administrative center in Sumy. Prior to that, the branch office was located in Liubotyn.

From August 22, 2018, in accordance with the order of CM-15/336, the station received its modern name. From September 14, 2019, the official website of Ukrzaliznytsia uses the name of the station Trostyanets-Smorodyne.

During the 2022 Russian invasion of Ukraine the railway station was used as headquarters by the Russian military. A battle that ensued with the Ukrainian army caused substantial damage to the station.

Passenger service
Long-distance passenger trains, regional, and suburban trains stop at Trostyanets-Smorodyne station.

Notes
 Tariff Guide No. 4. Book 1 (as of 05/15/2021) (Russian) Archived 05/15/2021.

References

External links

Info about Trostyanets-Smorodyne station on railwayz.info
Live timetable of passenger train departures and arrival
Live timetable of suburban trains, official site
Rail trips Trostyanets-Smorodyne on tokatema
Trostyanets-Smorodyne on trainphoto

Railway stations in Sumy Oblast
Sumy
Buildings and structures in Sumy Oblast
Railway stations opened in 1878